

This is a list of the National Register of Historic Places listings in Giles County, Tennessee.

This is intended to be a complete list of the properties and districts on the National Register of Historic Places in Giles County, Tennessee, United States. Latitude and longitude coordinates are provided for many National Register properties and districts; these locations may be seen together in a map.

There are 33 properties and districts listed on the National Register in the county. Three previously listed sites have been delisted.

Current listings

|}

Former listings
Two other properties were once listed, but have since been removed:

|}

See also

List of National Historic Landmarks in Tennessee
National Register of Historic Places listings in Tennessee

References

Giles
 
Buildings and structures in Giles County, Tennessee